Sveto is a village northwest of Komen in the Littoral region of Slovenia.

Name
Sveto was attested in written sources in 1347 as Suta (and as ze Nider/Obern Zawtt in 1485, Szawt in 1494, and Sutta in 1763–87). In the local dialect it is known as Sətu. The medieval inscriptions (including the Middle High German forms with  < ū) and the dialect name indicate that the modern Slovene name is a hypercorrection of *Suto, which is of unclear origin and may belong to a pre-Slavic substratum.

Mass grave

Sveto is the site of a mass grave from the period immediately after the Second World War. The Preserje Cave Mass Grave is located between Sveto and Ivanji Grad. It contains the remains of a large number of unidentified people scattered across the entire rubble-covered slope of the shaft. A partial exhumation in 2015 yielded the remains of 23 victims.

Church

The local church is dedicated to Saint Giles and belongs to the Parish of Komen.

References

External links

Sveto on Geopedia

Populated places in the Municipality of Komen